Lupu may refer to:

 Lupu (surname)
 Lupu Bridge (卢浦大桥), spanning the Huangpu River in Shanghai, China 
 Lupu, Funing County, Jiangsu (芦蒲镇), town in Funing County, Jiangsu, China
 Lupu River, a tributary of the river Râul Lung in Romania
 Lupu, a village in Cergău Commune, Alba County, Romania

See also 
 Lucid Puppy Linux
 Lupus
 Lupșa (disambiguation)
 Lupești (disambiguation)
 Lupoaia (disambiguation)